The Penn State Nittany Lions men's volleyball program has had a long tradition at Penn State University. Founded by Tom Tait, Tait coached the team from 1976 to 1989, and was named a USA Volleyball All-Time great coach in 2007.

Mark Pavlik has been the head coach since 1995 after serving as an assistant coach for five years. He has led the team to every EIVA conference championship since 1995 with the exception of 1998. Under his guidance, Penn State finished as NCAA runners-up in 1995 and 2006 before winning it all in 2008. He also led the team to an NCAA record of 15 straight (1999–2013) NCAA Final Four appearances. Pavlik was awarded his first ever AVCA National Coach of the Year in 2008.

History

1982
Penn State made their first ever NCAA Championship match this year. Current head coach Mark Pavlik was a manager on the team. Penn State was swept by perennial powerhouse UCLA in the final at Rec Hall, led by future Olympic gold medalist and Most Outstanding Player Karch Kiraly.

1994
1994 was a historic year, as Penn State became the first non-California university to win the men's volleyball championship. Playing in Fort Wayne, Indiana, the Lions defeated defending NCAA champion UCLA in a five-set match. After falling behind 2 sets to 1, UCLA looked to have the championship in their hands after being up 11–4 in the fourth set, needing to only get to 15. However, the Lions mounted a stunning comeback and went on an 11–1 run to take set four 15–12 and set five with the same score to win the national championship. It was then-head coach Tom Peterson's last year.

1997
Penn State got back to the final four, losing to UCLA in a five-set match in the semifinals. Senior Ivan Contreras was named the AVCA National Player of the Year, the first ever east coast player to win the award.  Brad Sweitzer's errant serve in the fifth set cost the Lions a trip to the championship game.

2006
After eight straight years of making the NCAA final four and losing in the semifinals, Penn State finally broke through. They defeated top ranked and top-seeded UC Irvine in the semifinals at Rec Hall in five games. Despite the successful semifinal result, Penn State lost to UCLA in the national championship.

2008
 

In the early 2008 season, Penn State swept UCLA for the first time since 1991, and also defeated west coast powers Hawai'i, Cal Baptist and Long Beach State. Penn State only lost one match in the regular season to George Mason, but got revenge on the Patriots in the EIVA tournament finals, securing their bid for their NCAA record tenth consecutive final four appearance. Penn State improved to 55–3 all time in the EIVA championship.

Penn State was the top seed in the final four, the first time in the history of the men's volleyball tournament that a non-west coast university was the top seed. The final four was held in Irvine, California at the Bren Events Center from May 1–3. After defeating Ohio State in the semifinals, Penn State met Pepperdine in the final. After dropping the first set, Penn State went on to win the next three to defeat the Waves in four games. Matt Anderson, the AVCA Co-National Player of the Year, was named the tournament's Most Outstanding Player. Four other Penn State players were named All Americans.

Pepperdine head coach Marv Dunphy said earlier in the NCAA tournament that the 2008 Penn State men's volleyball team was the best men's volleyball team to ever come out of the east or midwest.

2013
In 2013, the Nittany Lions ended their season with a defeat by the BYU Cougars 0–3 (21–25, 16–25, 22–25) in the second semifinal of the NCAA championships on May 2, 2013, at UCLA's Pauley Pavilion.

All-Americans
The Penn State men's volleyball program has seen 83 AVCA All American honors.

National Awards
Mark Pavlik has earned one National Coach of the Year award, while former head coach Tom Peterson got the accolade once as well. Two Penn State players have been named Player of the Year.

All-time roster
From 1973 to 2017, the All Time Roster contains 230-plus different student-athletes, including two Jeff Johnsons.  The roster below includes all lettermen, red shirts, and partial years.

See also
Penn State Nittany Lions women's volleyball

References

External links